The 2006 Asian Men's Junior Handball Championship (10th tournament) took place in Hiroshima from 22 August–31 August. It acts as the Asian qualifying tournament for the 2007 Men's Junior World Handball Championship in Macedonia.

Draw

Preliminary round

Group A

Group B

Placement 5th–10th

9th/10th

7th/8th

5th/6th

Final round

Semifinals

Bronze medal match

Gold medal match

Final standing

References
Official website(  2009-09-04)

International sports competitions hosted by Japan
Asian Mens Junior Handball Championship, 2006
Asia
Asian Handball Championships